Peter Reekers (born 2 June 1981) is a Dutch professional football coach and former player who serves as the assistant manager of both Netherlands U21 and Heracles Almelo. 

During his playing career, he played as a central defender for DETO, Heracles Almelo, VVV-Venlo and AGOVV.

Honours

Player
Heracles Almelo
 Eerste Divisie: 2004–05

VVV-Venlo
 Eerste Divisie: 2008–09

References

1981 births
Living people
Dutch footballers
Eredivisie players
Eerste Divisie players
Heracles Almelo players
AGOVV Apeldoorn players
VVV-Venlo players
People from Vriezenveen
Association football defenders
Footballers from Overijssel
Dutch football managers
Heracles Almelo non-playing staff
DETO Twenterand players